Eucutta Creek is a stream in the U.S. state of Mississippi. It is a tributary to the Chickasawhay River.Eucutta is a name derived from the Choctaw language, most likely meaning "large pond".

In 2014, a pipeline near Eucutta sprung a leak, discharging about 50 barrels of oil and 40 barrels of brine into the Eucutta creek. Many Wayne County environmental agencies have cleaned up the spill since then.

References

Rivers of Mississippi
Rivers of Clarke County, Mississippi
Rivers of Jasper County, Mississippi
Rivers of Wayne County, Mississippi
Mississippi placenames of Native American origin